Usliza Usman (born 20 May 1995) is a Malaysian footballer who plays a midfielder for the Malaysia women's national football team.

She represented Malaysia at the 2016 AFF Women's Championship.

References

1995 births
Living people
Malaysian women's footballers
Malaysia women's international footballers
Place of birth missing (living people)
Women's association football midfielders
Malaysian women's futsal players
Competitors at the 2017 Southeast Asian Games
Competitors at the 2019 Southeast Asian Games
Southeast Asian Games competitors for Malaysia